"Under My Skin" is a song by Australian singer-songwriter Deborah Conway. It was released as the second single from her debut studio album String of Pearls (1991). It peaked at number 34 in Australia in December 1991.

Track listings
 CD Single/ 7”
 "Under My Skin" - 3:36
 "It's All Part Of My Education" - 4:34

Weekly charts

References

External links

1991 songs
1991 singles
Mushroom Records singles
Songs written by Scott Cutler